Elisa Mouliaá (born Madrid 7 January 1989) is a Spanish actress. She studied drama at the International study of actor Juan Carlos Corazza, and has starred in some films, theatre and TV.

TV

Filmography

Short films

Theater

Music video

Awards

References

External links 
Official Web
 http://www.elisa-mouliaa.com
VIDEOREEL
 https://www.youtube.com/watch?v=Z_7L8TGF3yU
 Social network
 https://www.facebook.com/ElisaMouliaaOficial
 https://www.twitter.com/ElisaMouliaa
 REFERENCES
 
 
 
 

1989 births
Living people
Actresses from Madrid
Spanish film actresses
Spanish stage actresses
Spanish television actresses
21st-century Spanish actresses